The Class of Letters (Portuguese: Classe de Letras) of the Lisbon Academy of Sciences holds an official consultative role on the Portuguese language in Portugal.

It was created by the queen Maria I of Portugal, on 24 December 1779, during the Age of Enlightenment.

It is based in Lisbon. The current president of the board is Adriano Moreira.

See also
Academia Brasileira de Letras
International Portuguese Language Institute
Sciences Academy of Lisbon

External links
 

Portuguese language academies
Language regulators
Portuguese language
Organizations established in 1779
1779 establishments in Portugal
Organisations based in Lisbon
Lisbon Academy of Sciences

es:Academia de las Ciencias de Lisboa
pt:Academia das Ciências de Lisboa